The Bearhawk Companion is an American amateur-built aircraft, designed by Bob Barrows, that is produced by Bearhawk Aircraft of Austin, Texas, introduced in August 2019. The aircraft is supplied as a kit for amateur construction, with first customer deliveries in October 2019.

Design and development
The design goals for the Companion were to produce an aircraft with the features of the Bearhawk Patrol, but with side-by-side configuration seating, in response to customer demand and a deposit from a launch customer.

The Companion features a strut-braced high-wing, a two side-by-side seats in an enclosed cabin accessed by doors, fixed conventional landing gear and a single engine in tractor configuration.

The aircraft has a newly designed welded 4130 steel tubing fuselage, covered in doped aircraft fabric. The wing is identical to the Patrol wing and is made from aluminum sheet components and is covered in flush-riveted aluminum sheet.

The first flight of a completed aircraft by the launch customer took place on 17 May 2021. The aircraft took ten months and 1,000 hours to complete.

Operational history
A 2021 review in Aviation Pros called it "a very rugged utility plane with a large area for cargo."

Specifications (Companion)

References

External links
Official press release

Companion
2010s United States sport aircraft
2010s United States civil utility aircraft
Single-engined tractor aircraft
High-wing aircraft
Homebuilt aircraft
Aircraft first flown in 2019